Michael William Dale (born 22 March 1968 in Bradford, West Riding of Yorkshire) is the keyboardist for the English rock indie band, Embrace. He grew up in the Heaton area of Bradford, West Yorkshire.

He officially joined the band in October 1998, just after the release of their first album, The Good Will Out.  Dale had been playing live and on record with the rest of the band beforehand, but was an 'unofficial member'. He composed all of the string arrangements for The Good Will Out.

Prior to joining Embrace, he had previous experience with local bands Poppy Factory, Kitsch, Copingsaw, Lazer Boy and more famously Cud, who enjoyed moderate success themselves, including three Top 40 singles.

As well as his continuing work as a member of Embrace, Dale is currently working as a producer, making records with bands such as Glass Mountain, LELO, Marsicans, Talkboy and Faux Pas. He also owns and runs his own studio, known as 'The Cellar Of Dreams'.

In 2018, Dale produced an album with One Sided Horse entitled, “Between Light and Space” which was released via UK Independent Butterfly Effect Label.

One Sided Horse began as a side project of Preston-based singer-songwriter, Mark Whiteside (Evil Blizzard). Dale also performed on the album alongside fellow Embrace members, Steve Firth, Mike Heaton and Richard McNamara.

In early 2019, Dale and some close friends set up a label called 'the boy who left home to learn fear'. Run as a collective of filmmakers, visual artists and musicians, the label released two singles on 7 June 2019:
LFR1 - LELO - "About A Journey" (digital and 7" coloured vinyl
LFR2 - Glass Mountain - "Autumn Jam" (digital only)

References

1968 births
Living people
English rock keyboardists
English rock guitarists
English male guitarists
English multi-instrumentalists
English songwriters
English music managers
Musicians from Bradford
British male songwriters